Pacasmayo is the largest cement company in the north of Peru. The company has 3 cement plants in Piura , Pacasmayo and another in Rioja with a total annual capacity of 4.9 million tons of cement. It was founded by Luis Hochschild Plaut.

References 

Cement companies of Peru
Companies based in La Libertad Region
Construction and civil engineering companies established in 1949
Manufacturing companies established in 1949
1949 establishments in Peru
Companies based in Lima
Companies listed on the New York Stock Exchange
Peruvian brands